Carson Scott Hocevar (born January 28, 2003) is an American professional dirt track and stock car racing driver. He competes full-time in the NASCAR Craftsman Truck Series, driving the No. 42 Chevrolet Silverado for Niece Motorsports, and part-time in the NASCAR Xfinity Series, driving the No. 77 Chevrolet Camaro for Spire Motorsports. He has also competed in the ARCA Menards Series and ARCA Menards Series West in the past.

Racing career

Early career
Hocevar began competing in quarter midgets at the age of 7, winning 79 feature races and 15 national championships. He started racing at Berlin Raceway in 2015 as a 12 year old and won the track's Outlaw Late Model championship. He won his first Super Late Model race at the track in 2016, but NASCAR stopped all drivers under 14 from competing from sanctioned tracks. Hocevar returned in 2017 and won the track's Super Late Model championship.

ARCA Menards Series

Hocevar competed in 11 ARCA Menards Series races between 2018 and 2019, with 9 top ten finishes and 2 pole positions. 

In 2019, he joined the Driver's Edge Development Program.

NASCAR Craftsman Truck Series
Hocevar made his NASCAR Gander Outdoors Truck Series debut in the 2019 Eldora Dirt Derby driving the No. 3 Chevrolet Silverado for Jordan Anderson Racing. He qualified for the main event by finishing third in the third qualifying race. He returned to the series in November at the Lucas Oil 150, driving a No. 56 for JAR in a partnership with Hill Motorsports.

On December 20, 2019, Hocevar joined Niece Motorsports for a nine-race schedule in 2020.

On September 24, 2020, Hocevar and Niece announced a full-season schedule in 2021. During the season, Hocevar would have a very successful rookie season nearly winning multiple races. He finished second at Charlotte and fourth at Las Vegas. He re-signed with Niece in 2022 and led the most laps of the Spring Vegas race until he was turned with 36 to go.

On June 4, 2022, Hocevar broke his right tibia at the ankle during the final lap of the Gateway race when his truck was t-boned by Tyler Hill. He underwent surgery prior to the Sonoma race. Hocevar took the pole position before wrecking in turn 10. On lap 11, he was relieved by Daniel Suárez, who took the No. 42 to a sixth place finish.

NASCAR Xfinity Series 
On March 7, 2023, Spire Motorsports announced that they will expand their racing operations to the NASCAR Xfinity Series, with Hocevar running six races in their No. 77 car, making his debut in the series.

Motorsports career results

NASCAR
(key) (Bold – Pole position awarded by qualifying time. Italics – Pole position earned by points standings or practice time. * – Most laps led.)

Xfinity Series

Craftsman Truck Series

 Season still in progress
 Ineligible for series points

ARCA Menards Series
(key) (Bold – Pole position awarded by qualifying time. Italics – Pole position earned by points standings or practice time. * – Most laps led.)

ARCA Menards Series West

References

External links

 
 Official profile at Niece Motorsports
 

Living people
2003 births
NASCAR drivers
ARCA Menards Series drivers
Racing drivers from Michigan
People from Portage, Michigan
ARCA Midwest Tour drivers